The 1932 season was the Chicago Bears' 13th in the National Football League. The team was able to improve on their 9–4–1 record from 1931 and finished with a 7–1–6 record under third-year head coach Ralph Jones.

Season overview
The season started strangely with three consecutive 0–0 ties. After a 0–2 loss to the Packers, the Bears had scored zero points in four games. After that, the offense got on track and the defense stayed incredibly stingy. The Bears were undefeated in their last nine "regular season" games (there was no established playoff system), with six wins, four by shutout, and three ties.

The team that gave the Bears the most trouble was the Portsmouth Spartans. The club tied with the Spartans with identical 6–1 records (ties did not count then and were omitted), so a playoff game was set up to determine a winner. The Bears defeated the Spartans, 9–0 in the first-ever NFL postseason game, which oddly enough was played indoors at Chicago Stadium because it was expected to be cold at Wrigley Field and organizers wanted to maximize the attendance and gate revenue.

For the year, the powerful tandem of Red Grange and Bronko Nagurski again paced the Bears as Grange scored 7 touchdowns and Nagurski ran for 4 and also passed for 3 more. Keith Molesworth also contributed with 3 touchdowns on his own while passing for 3 more. Luke Johnsos had probably his finest season, catching two touchdown passes and scoring twice on defense as well. Coach Ralph Jones also found a reliable kicker in Paul "Tiny" Engebretson.

Future Hall of Fame players
 Red Grange, back
 Bill Hewitt, end (rookie from University of Michigan)
 Bronko Nagurski, fullback
 George Trafton, center

Other leading players
 Carl Brumbaugh, quarterback
 John Doehring, back (rookie)
 Paul Engebretsen, guard/kicker (rookie from Northwestern)
 Luke Johnsos, end
 Joe Kopcha, guard (back after two years off)
 Keith Molesworth, back
 Dick Nesbitt, back
 Ookie Miller, center

Players departed from 1931
 Link Lyman, tackle (did not play for unknown reasons)

Schedule

The December 18 game was added to break the tie and is known as the 1932 NFL Playoff Game

Standings

NFL Playoff Game:  Chicago Bears 9, Portsmouth Spartans 0

Awards
 NFL Championship (2)

References

Chicago Bears
Chicago Bears seasons
National Football League championship seasons
Chicago Bears